Bokermann's casque-headed tree frog (Trachycephalus atlas) is a species of frog in the family Hylidae endemic to Brazil. Its natural habitats are subtropical or tropical dry forests, moist savanna, subtropical or tropical dry shrubland, and intermittent freshwater marshes.
It is threatened by habitat loss.

References

Trachycephalus
Endemic fauna of Brazil
Amphibians described in 1966
Taxonomy articles created by Polbot